Dmitri Vyacheslavovich Vlasenkov (born 1 January 1978) is a Russian former ice hockey forward who last played with Severstal Cherepovets of the Kontinental Hockey League.

He was selected by the Calgary Flames in the 3rd round (73rd overall) of the 1996 NHL Entry Draft.

References

External links

1978 births
Living people
People from Olenegorsk, Murmansk Oblast
Russian ice hockey left wingers
Avangard Omsk players
Calgary Flames draft picks
Sportspeople from Murmansk Oblast